Lotta Volkova (born 1984) is a Russian fashion stylist and model. She is the in-house stylist for Vetements and formerly of Balenciaga. She is the stylist and collaborator of Demna Gvasalia, the creative director of Balenciaga and the co-founder of Vetements.

Early life and education
She was born in 1984 in Vladivostok, Russia. She was named after the Led Zeppelin song "Whole Lotta Love". Her mother was a professor of physics, and her father was a sea captain. During her youth growing up in an isolated region of Russia, where the internet was an important tool for her to find information.

When she was 17, she moved to London. She took three month long courses in the arts until she was old enough to enroll at Central Saint Martins where she studied art and design.

Career
While at Central Saint Martins, she designed her own line Lotta Skeletrix. The line was popular and was picked up by Dover Street Market.

She moved to Paris in 2008.

Her first fashion gig in Paris was a photo shoot for Ellen von Unwerth.

In 2020, she collaborated with Adidas on a collection of ready-to-wear clothing and accessories.

In 2022, she launched her first collection with Jean Paul Gaultier.

Controversy
In 2022, a controversial ad campaign by Balenciaga was heavily criticized for its depiction of children holding BDSM-themed teddy bears, as well as for featuring text from the federal statute the United States v. Williams (2008). Volkova received significant criticism for her involvement with the brand, as well as for previous Instagram posts she shared which depicted gothic and occult-themed photographs and artwork. A photograph of a model carrying two blood-soaked dolls during a runway show was widely circulated at the time and alleged to be Volkova, though this was later disproven, as the photographs were attributed to be that of an unnamed model taken during the 2016 China Fashion Week.

It was subsequently reported that Volkova had not worked with the Balenciaga since 2017, and had no involvement with the campaign in question. In a press release, a representative for Volkova stated: "She condemns the abuse of children in any form...  Lotta Volkova has not worked with Balenciaga or its team since 2017 and she has in no way participated in the brand's recent Instagram or advertising campaigns."

References

External links

https://www.vogue.com/article/future-of-fashion-shows-lotta-volkova

Living people

1984 births
Russian fashion designers
Alumni of Central Saint Martins
People from Vladivostok